Marvin Ayhan Obuz (born 25 January 2002) is a German professional footballer who plays as a winger for 2. Bundesliga club Holstein Kiel, on loan from 1. FC Köln. He made his professional debut for 1. FC Köln in October 2021.

Club career
Obuz began his youth career at  a non-league club in Hürth. In 2009, he joined the youth academy of 1. FC Köln. Having progressed through Köln's youth sides, he was promoted to 1. FC Köln II, the clubs's reserve squad at the start of the 2020–21 season. In January 2021, Obuz was introduced to his club's first squad under manager Markus Gisdol.

On 27 October 2021, Obuz made his professional debut in a DFB Pokal match against VfB Stuttgart. In July 2022, he joined Holstein Kiel on a one-year loan spell.

International career
Born in Germany, Obuz is of Turkish descent. He has represented Germany as a youth international.

References

Living people
2002 births
German people of Turkish descent
German footballers
Footballers from Cologne
Association football wingers
Germany youth international footballers
1. FC Köln players
1. FC Köln II players
Holstein Kiel players
Holstein Kiel II players